Szonów  is a village in the administrative district of Gmina Głogówek, within Prudnik County, Opole Voivodeship, in south-western Poland, close to the Czech border.

Szonów/Schönau was, for many prisoners of war, a stopping place on 'The Long March' during the final months of the Second World War in Europe. About 30,000 Allied PoWs were force-marched westward across Poland, Czechoslovakia and Germany in appalling winter conditions, lasting about four months from January to April 1945. http://www.lamsdorf.com/the-long-march.html

References

Villages in Prudnik County